Georg Lasson (13 July 1862, Berlin – 2 December 1932, Berlin) was a German Protestant theologian, and a son of Adolf Lasson. He was a co-editor of Georg Wilhelm Friedrich Hegel's Sämtliche Werke in the Meiner edition (see Hegel bibliography). Although the result is not always praised today, his edition is useful to researches as he had access to manuscripts that have since been lost.

Biography 
Georg Lasson studied philosophy and theology at the Berlin University and the University of Tübingen. In 1885 he became a curate in Potsdam, and three years later, a pastor in Friedersdorf (near Storkow). He was pastor at the Bartholomäuskirche in Berlin from 1902 to 1927. In 1921 he received a PhD from the University of Kiel.

He published his theological research in Theorie des christilichen Dogmas (1897) and Grundfragen der Glaubenslehre (1913). After 1900 he went to philosophy. Influenced by his father Adolf Lasson, he worked on Hegel and German Idealism that he interpreted through the Greek thought (Plato and Aristoteles). In Hegel's dialectic he saw a possibility for a synthesis between philosophy and theology. He described the dialectic as the "identity of identity and non-identity" (Was heisst Hegelianismus?, 1916). He published a critical edition of Hegel's works and edited a series called Hegel Archiv (1912), after the Kant Studien.

Literary works 
 Hegels sämtlicher Werke", (co-editor) 18 Volumes, 1905–1944. Leipzig: Meiner.  – Hegel's collected works.
 Gottessohn im Fleisch, 1892 – Son of God in the flesh.
 Zur Theorie des christlichen Dogmas, 1897 – On the theory of Christian dogma.
 Beiträge zur Hegelforschung, 2 Vols., 1909 – Contributions to Hegel research.
 Grundfragen des Glaubens, 1913 – Basic questions of doctrine.
 Hegel als Geschichtsphilosoph, 1920 – Hegel as a philosopher of history.

Notes 

1862 births
1932 deaths
19th-century German Protestant theologians
German Protestant clergy
German editors
German male non-fiction writers
19th-century male writers